Harald Halvorsen (29 November 1898 – 17 March 1992) was a Norwegian footballer. He played in one match for the Norway national football team in 1925.

References

External links
 

1898 births
1992 deaths
Norwegian footballers
Norway international footballers
Place of birth missing
Association footballers not categorized by position